Div Rud (also Romanized as Dīv Rūd; also known as Divaru, Dīveh Rūd, and Dīwāru) is a village in Rahmatabad Rural District, Rahmatabad and Blukat District, Rudbar County, Gilan Province, Iran. At the 2006 census, its population was 116, in 39 families.

References 

Populated places in Rudbar County